General elections were held in Honduras in October 1902. Manuel Bonilla of La Democracia won the presidential election with 48.7% of the vote.

Results

President
The official results had a total of 58,589 valid votes, 50 more than the total of votes for each candidate.

Vice President

References

Honduras
General
Elections in Honduras
Presidential elections in Honduras
Honduras
Election and referendum articles with incomplete results